Meraj UAV is an Iranian belonging to the Islamic Revolutionary Guard Corps. This unmanned aerial vehicle is able to fly at a speed of 140 km/hr to an altitude of 12,000 feet. Meraj's weight is 33 kilograms and is capable to carry a load of 5 kilograms. This UAV which is considered among the latest IRGC ground drones, has done its tests/experiments, and is ready to perform reconnaissance missions. Meraj unmanned aerial vehicle is a product of design/construction at the NEZSA Self-Sufficiency Jihad Organization's UAV Research Center.

History
The first time, Meraj-UAV was indicated during a parade on 22 September 2017 in Tehran. The recoil of this Iranian unmanned aerial vehicle is a kind of landing on the belly of the UAV, and that's why this utilizes a built-in elevator camera in its body, which doesn't cause of any damage during its landing. The utilizing of this sort of launcher lets the ascension unmanned aerial vehicle to not need a specific runway for landing/takeoff, and in order to be capable to fly on any type of road(s) or highway(s) that possesses a flat surface.

References

Military equipment of Iran
Unmanned aerial vehicles of Iran
Aircraft manufactured in Iran
Iranian military aircraft